Henderson Park is located in Chehalis, Washington in the city's South Market district and is a block northeast of nearby Recreation Park.

The land was donated to Chehalis by the Henderson Lumber Company in 1908 but forgotten by the city until 1913, though the area was treated as a park by local residents. The park would not be recognized by the city until 1916. Full ownership was given to Chehalis, by deed, in 1962.

The  park hosts several buildings used by various city government divisions, most notably the Chehalis Parks and Recreation Department, and as a command center during emergencies in the city.  During its early history, the grounds had been used as an automobile stop, a market place, picnic area, and a playground. By the 1940s, the space began to be primarily utilized for the State Department of Natural Resources and then later by the Chehalis fire department and the Jaycees.

Rose bushes were dispersed through the site during a transfer of plantings from the closure of the Chehalis Municipal Rose Garden but the roses did not flourish. The park's pumphouse is dressed as a gingerbread house during the winter holiday season.

See also
Parks and recreation in Chehalis, Washington

References 

Parks in Washington (state)